The Flat Lake Festival is an annual event organised by Patrick McCabe (novelist) and the Welsh film director Kevin Allen (actor) on the Hilton Park farm estate in Clones, Co. Monaghan, first held in 2007. The attractions of the festival are readings, comedy, music and theatre that take place among the barns and bales of hay, abandoned tractors and ancient oaks of the estate over the period of a long weekend, just a couple of miles outside the town of Clones on the back road to Cavan town.¨nthWORD calls it a "cheap, off-beat, anarchic weekend that is hard to beat"

2010 Festival

2010 Line-up (partial list)
Alexei Sayle, 
Crystal Swing, 
Jack Lukeman, 
Mundy, 
Shane MacGowan, 
Maria Doyle Kennedy, 
Viv Albertine, 
The Swarbriggs, 
Frankie McBride, 
Kathy Durkin, 
The Flaws, 
Anne Enright

Notes

External links
  Flat Lake Literary & Arts Festival website
  A review of The 2010 Flat Lake Literary & Arts Festival by Jessica Maybury for nthWORD Magazine

2000s in Irish music
2010s in Irish music
Annual events in Ireland
June events
Music festivals in Ireland
Summer events in the Republic of Ireland